The Cardwell–Parrish House is a house located in southwest Portland, Oregon listed on the National Register of Historic Places.

See also
 National Register of Historic Places listings in Southwest Portland, Oregon

References

Further reading

1888 establishments in Oregon
Houses completed in 1888
Houses on the National Register of Historic Places in Portland, Oregon
Queen Anne architecture in Oregon
Southwest Portland, Oregon
Stick-Eastlake architecture in Oregon
Portland Historic Landmarks